was a Japanese politician. He was a member of the House of Representatives of Japan and a member of the Liberal Democratic Party. He was Chief Cabinet Secretary in the government of Prime Minister Yasuo Fukuda from 2007 to 2008 and twice Minister for Foreign Affairs, in the cabinets of Junichiro Koizumi and Shinzō Abe. He resigned as the Speaker of the House of Representatives on 21 April 2015 after suffering from a stroke.

Early life and education
Machimura was born on 17 October 1944. He attended the University of Tokyo and Wesleyan University in the United States.

Career

Machimura was elected to his first term in the House of Representatives in the December 1983 election, and he was re-elected in each election since. He became Minister of Education, Science, Sports and Culture on 11 September 1997, as part of Prime Minister Ryutaro Hashimoto's second cabinet, and became State Secretary for Foreign Affairs on 31 July 1998, in Keizō Obuchi's first cabinet. In March 2000, he became Special Advisor to the Prime Minister, serving under Obuchi and his successor, Yoshirō Mori. On 5 December 2000, he became Minister of Education, Science, Sports and Culture and Director-General of the Science and Technology Agency, before becoming Minister of Education, Culture, Sports, Science and Technology on 6 January 2001.

He was the Minister for Foreign Affairs under Prime Minister Junichiro Koizumi from 27 September 2004 to 31 October 2005. His goals included signing a treaty with Russia relations with China and Korea form leader resolving a border dispute, and investigating the whereabouts of Japanese hostages who were kidnapped by North Korean agents during the 1970s and 1980s. He was replaced by Tarō Asō in the cabinet reshuffle that followed the 11 September 2005 election.

He was appointed Minister for Foreign Affairs again by Prime Minister Shinzō Abe on 27 August 2007. In 2006, Machimura became chairman of the Seiwa Seisaku Kenkyūkai, the LDP's largest faction. As such, on 14 September 2007, he backed Yasuo Fukuda's bid to become Abe's successor, following Abe's resignation on 12 September. Since 2007, Machimura had co-chaired his faction alongside Hidenao Nakagawa and Shūzen Tanigawa.

In Fukuda's government, sworn in on 16 September 2007, Machimura became Chief Cabinet Secretary and State Minister in charge of abduction issues. He was replaced by Takeo Kawamura in the cabinet of prime minister Taro Aso, which was appointed on 24 September 2008.

He was the vice president of the Japan-China Friendship Parliamentarians' Union.

Personal life
On 18 December 2007, Machimura said at an official press conference that he believed in the existence of UFOs.

On 1 June 2015, he died after a cerebral infarction at an hospital in Tokyo.

Honours
Junior Second Rank (1 June 2015; posthumous)

References

External links

1944 births
2015 deaths
University of Tokyo alumni
Wesleyan University alumni
People from Numazu, Shizuoka
Politicians from Hokkaido
Members of the House of Representatives (Japan)
Education ministers of Japan
Foreign ministers of Japan
Japanese anti-communists
Liberal Democratic Party (Japan) politicians
21st-century Japanese politicians
Culture ministers of Japan
Technology ministers of Japan
Government ministers of Japan
Science ministers of Japan
Speakers of the House of Representatives (Japan)